The year 1955 saw a number of significant events in radio broadcasting history.

Events
2 May – Opening at Wrotham, Kent, of the United Kingdom's first VHF/FM transmitters.
September (Labor Day weekend) – First Sig Alert broadcast in California.
22 September – The character Grace Archer dies in the BBC radio serial The Archers; a spoiler for the launch of ITV in the UK on the same day.
20 October – Disc jockey Bill Randle of WERE (Cleveland) is the key presenter of a concert at Brooklyn High School (Ohio), featuring Pat Boone and Bill Haley & His Comets and opening with Elvis Presley, not only Elvis's first performance north of the Mason–Dixon line, but also his first filmed performance, for a documentary on Randle titled The Pied Piper of Cleveland.
17 November – Creation of the Communauté des radios publiques de langue française (CRPLF) - an association of the French-language public broadcasters of France, Switzerland, Belgium, and Canada, later to become, in 2002, the Radios francophones publiques (RFP).
26 November – In Sweden, the national public broadcaster Radiotjänst (modern-day Sveriges Radio) begins transmission, via FM, of its second radio channel in Stockholm, Gothenburg, Malmö, and Örebro.

Debuts
April 24 - X Minus One debuts on NBC Radio
June 12 – Monitor debuts  on NBC Radio.
August 8 – WPLM/1390 signs on.

Closings
March 10 – The Silver Eagle broadcasts its last episode.
March 23 – The Big Story ends its run on NBC. 
March 27 – Hallmark Hall of Fame ends its run on network radio (CBS). 
May 22 – The Jack Benny Program airs its last radio episode and moves solely to television.
June 7 – Lux Radio Theater ends its run on CBS.
June 9 – Sergeant Preston of the Yukon ends its run on network radio (Mutual).  
June 30 – Barrie Craig, Confidential Investigator ends its run on network radio (NBC).
July 1 – Joyce Jordan, M.D. ends its run on network radio (NBC). 
July 15 – Break the Bank ends its run on network radio (NBC). 
October 13 – Dr. Sixgun ends its run on network radio (NBC).

Births
January – Dirk Maggs, English radio producer.
February 10 – Jim Cramer, American television personality, hedge fund manager and bestselling author.
February 23 – Tom Bodett, American author, voice actor, radio host and spokesman for hotel chain Motel 6.
April 5 – Janice Long, born Janice Chegwin, English disc jockey.
May 22 – Dale Winton, English broadcast presenter (died 2018).
July 9 – Fred Norris, American radio personality.
July 19 – Karen Cheryl, French singer, actress and broadcast presenter.
October 4 – Dale Connelly, American co-host (with Tom Keith, a.k.a. Jim Ed Poole) of The Morning Show on Minnesota Public Radio.
Approximate date – Christopher Douglas, English comedy actor-writer.

References

 
Radio by year